Krindjabo is a village in south-eastern Ivory Coast. It is in the sub-prefecture of Aboisso, Aboisso Department, Sud-Comoé Region, Comoé District.

Krindjabo was a commune until March 2012, when it became one of 1126 communes nationwide that were abolished.

Krindjabo was the capital of the former Anyi people (Agni) Kingdom of Sanwi.

Notes

Former communes of Ivory Coast
Populated places in Comoé District
Populated places in Sud-Comoé